Unique 3 are an English rave band from Bradford, Yorkshire. Formed in 1988, they pioneered the 'bleep techno' sound. Their song "The Theme" captured this sound, and it later appeared in remixed form on the Chemical Brothers' compilation album, Brothers Gonna Work It Out. Their most commercially successful record was "Musical Melody", which reached number 29 on the UK Singles Chart in April 1990 and led to a performance on Top of the Pops.

Discography

Albums
 Jus' Unique (10, 1990)
 Invasive Signals (Fat!, 2007)

Singles

References

External links
 

English techno music groups
Musical groups established in 1988
Musical groups from Bradford